Richard Gedlich (17 February 1900 – 5 January 1971) was a German international footballer.

References

1900 births
1971 deaths
Association football forwards
German footballers
Germany international footballers